Yevgeni Yefremov is the name of:
 Yevgeni Borisovich Yefremov (born 1970), retired Russian footballer
 Yevgeni Gennadyevich Yefremov (born 1979), Russian footballer